Cavendish is a census-designated place, the central village of the town of Cavendish, Windsor County, Vermont, United States. Until the midnineteenth century it was known as Duttonsville.  As of the 2010 census, the population of the CDP was 179, compared to 1,367 for the entire town of Cavendish.

Cavendish is the site of the 1848 accident where Phineas Gage got an iron rod shot through his skull while preparing a railroad bed. He survived, and after treatment became a case study for brain researchers. The town has erected a memorial to Gage. The town is also the birth place of Nettie Stevens, the scientist who discovered the Y chromosome.

Geography
Cavendish is located along Vermont Route 131 in the Black River valley.  Route 131 heads west to Proctorsville, a larger village within the town of Cavendish, then connects with Vermont Route 103 to Ludlow. To the east, Route 131 leads to the village of Ascutney on the Connecticut River.

References

Census-designated places in Vermont
Census-designated places in Windsor County, Vermont